The mixed team relay H1-5 road cycling event at the 2020 Summer Paralympics took place on 2 September 2021, at Fuji Speedway, Tokyo. 30 riders, 3 riders per team, competed in this event.

The H category is for cyclists with lower limb impairment which will involve the use to handcycle. This is the first time the Paralympics will feature in all H category classification (H1-5) to the mixed team relay.

Results
The event took place on 2 September 2021, at 15:30 :

References

Men's road race